Erastus Dow Palmer (April 2, 1817March 9, 1904) was an American sculptor.

Life
Palmer was born in Pompey, New York. He was the second of nine children. He showed early artistic promise, and pursued his father's trade of carpentry. Palmer married Matilda Alton in 1839 and had a son, but both mother and child died soon after; he remarried, to Mary Jean Seamans, in 1840, and settled in Utica, New York. In his leisure moments as a carpenter Palmer started by carving portraits in cameo, and earned the encouragement of Thomas R. Walker, a local art patron in Utica, who introduced him to prominent artists in New York City.

By 1849, Palmer had relocated to Albany with his family and had transitioned from cameo-cutting to large-scale sculpture. He worked in a primarily neoclassical style. Palmer mounted an exhibition of twelve of his sculptures, known as "the Palmer Marbles," at the National Academy of Design in 1856, aiding his rise to prominence. His major works include The White Captive (1858) in the permanent collection of the Metropolitan Museum of Art, New York, Peace in Bondage (1863), Angel at the Sepulchre (1865), in Albany, New York, a bronze statue of Chancellor Robert R. Livingston (1874), in Statuary Hall, Capitol, Washington, D.C., and many portrait busts. Palmer died at his home in Albany on March 9, 1904, and is buried in Albany Rural Cemetery.

Palmer admired the work of William Cullen Bryant, Asher B. Durand, and Frederic Edwin Church. Palmer was a friend of Church, and his work is represented in the collection at Olana, Church's home in Hudson, New York. The Albany Institute of History & Art also has significant holdings of Palmer's sculpture.

Palmer's son, Walter Launt Palmer (1854–1932), was also an artist best known for his paintings of winter scenes.

Notes

Sources

External links

Art and the empire city: New York, 1825-1861, an exhibition catalog from The Metropolitan Museum of Art (fully available online as PDF), which contains material on Palmer (see index)
 Marble Statue Female Nude and others
 Short bio
 Painting by Walter Launt Palmer
  The Winterthur Library  Overview of an archival collection on Erastus Dow Palmer.
 

1817 births
1904 deaths
American male sculptors
19th-century American sculptors
19th-century American male artists
Burials at Albany Rural Cemetery
Artists from Albany, New York